Wake Forest is a town in Franklin, Granville and Wake counties in the U.S. state of North Carolina; located almost entirely in Wake County, it lies just north of the state capital, Raleigh. At the 2020 census, the population was 47,601.  That is up from 30,117 in 2010, up from 12,588 in 2000. The U.S. Census Bureau estimates the city's population to be 47,601 as of April 1, 2020. In 2007, the town was listed by Forbes magazine as the 20th fastest growing suburb in America, with a 73.2 percent increase in population between 2000 and 2006. Wake Forest was the original home of Wake Forest University for 122 years before it moved to Winston-Salem in 1956.

The U.S. Office of Management and Budget also includes Wake Forest as a part of the Raleigh-Durham-Cary Combined Statistical Area, which has a population of  2,106,463 as of U.S. Census 2020 Population Estimates. The Office of Management and Budget redefined the Federal Statistical Areas and dismantled what had been for decades the Raleigh-Durham-Chapel Hill Metropolitan Statistical Area. They have now been split them into two separate Metropolitan Statistical Areas labeled Raleigh-Cary and Durham-Chapel Hill. However they still function as one Research Triangle (or colloquially The Triangle) metropolitan area.

History
In 1832, Dr. Calvin Jones, originally from New England, bought  of forested land in Wake County, North Carolina. He built his plantation here. The sparsely populated area became known as the Forest of Wake, or Wake Forest.  Jones sold his farm to the North Carolina Baptist Convention for $2,000, who opened the Wake Forest Manual Labor Institute, later Wake Forest College, on the site.  The Raleigh & Gaston Railroad, completed in 1840, established a depot in nearby Forestville that stimulated the school and surrounding village.  College leaders convinced the railroad to move the depot even closer to the college in 1874, leading to more economic development.  This community was incorporated as the "Town of Wake Forest College" in 1880.  In 1909, the word "College" was removed from the name of the town.  The college moved to the much larger city of Winston-Salem in 1956. Southeastern Baptist Theological Seminary began offering classes on the original campus of Wake Forest University in 1950, and occupied the entire campus when the university completed its move.

Government
Wake Forest operates under the council–manager form of government. The citizens elect a mayor and board of commissioners as the town's governing body. The town manager is appointed by the board to serve as the chief operating officer administering all municipal affairs. The current mayor is Vivian A. Jones (R, term expires 2025) and the board of commissioners are James E. "Jim" Dyer (R, 2023), Nick Sliwinski (R, 2025), Chad D. Sary (R, 2023), R. Keith Shackleford (D, 2025), and Adam B. Wright (D, 2023).

A new town hall facility opened in downtown Wake Forest in September 2010, and was LEED Platinum certified in November 2011. All town departments are housed in the facility, except police (which has its own building nearby) and public works.

Geography
Wake Forest is located at  (35.973289, -78.518789).

Wake Forest is located in the northeast-central region of North Carolina, where the North American Piedmont and Atlantic Coastal Plain regions meet. This area is known as the "Fall Line" because it marks the elevation inland at which waterfalls begin to appear in creeks and rivers. Its central Piedmont location situates Wake Forest approximately three hours by car west of Atlantic Beach, and four hours east of the Great Smoky Mountains.

Climate
Wake Forest enjoys a moderate subtropical climate, with moderate temperatures in the spring, fall, and winter. Summers are typically hot with high humidity. Winter highs generally range in the low 50s °F (10 to 13 °C) with lows in the low-to-mid 30s °F (-2 to 2 °C), although an occasional 60 °F (15 °C) or warmer winter day is not uncommon. Spring and fall days usually reach the low-to-mid 70s °F (low 20s °C), with lows at night in the lower 50s °F (10 to 14 °C). Summer daytime highs often reach the upper 80s to low 90s °F (29 to 35 °C). The rainiest months are July and August.

Demographics

2020 census

As of the 2020 United States census, there were 47,601 people, 14,732 households, and 11,104 families residing in the town.

2019
As of the 2019 census, there were 47,602 people and 11,059 households in Wake Forest. Wake Forest had a 232% population increase from 2000 to 2019. The population density was 1,614.4 inhabitants per square mile (623.1/km2). There were 5,091 housing units at an average density of 652.9 per square mile (252.0/km2). The racial makeup of the town was 77.1% White, 14.7% African American, 0.1% Native American, 1.5% Asian, 1.6% from other races, and 4.9% from two or more races. Hispanic or Latino of any race were 5.8% of the population.

There were 4,617 households, out of which 41.7% had children under the age of 18 living with them, 60.3% were married couples living together, 10.7% had a female householder with no husband present, and 26.2% were non-families. 20.6% of all households were made up of individuals, and 6.0% had someone living alone who was 65 years of age or older. The average household size was 2.66 and the average family size was 3.11.

As of the 2000 census, the population was spread out, with 29.7% under the age of 18, 7.4% from 18 to 24, 39.3% from 25 to 44, 15.8% from 45 to 64, and 7.9% who were 65 years of age or older. The median age was 32 years. For every 100 females, there were 91.8 males. For every 100 females age 18 and over, there were 89.0 males.

The median income for a household in the town was $80,215. Males had a median income of $63,585 versus $47,862 for females. The per capita income for the town was $22,746. About 5.3% of the population were below the poverty line.

Education

Primary and secondary education
The town is served by twelve public schools which are administered by the Wake County Public School System and Granville County Public School System. Public schools include:
 Heritage Elementary School
 Jones Dairy Elementary School
 Mount Energy Elementary
 Wake Forest Elementary School
 Richland Creek Elementary School (opened August 2012)
 G C Hawley Middle
 Heritage Middle School
 Granville Early College High
 Wake Forest Middle School
 Heritage High School (Wake Forest, North Carolina) (opened August 2010)
 Wake Forest High School

Charter schools include Franklin Academy (K-12),Wake Forest Charter Academy (K-8), Endeavor Charter School (K-8), and Envision Science Academy (K-8). Private schools include Thales Academy, All Saints Academy, and St. Catherine of Siena Catholic School, serving grades K-8. Wake Forest is also home to two Montessori schools, Wake Forest Montessori and Children's House of Wake Forest.

Higher learning
Wake Technical Community College is an area two-year college with a north campus on Louisburg Road in Raleigh. Southeastern Baptist Theological Seminary is a seminary of the Southern Baptist Convention. It began offering classes in 1950 on the original campus of Wake Forest University and is commonly known by its acronym, SEBTS.

Culture

Performing arts
Wake Forest hosts the annual Wake Forest Dance Festival every fall at E. Carroll Joyner Park.

Historical locations
The DuBois Center is listed on the National Register of Historic Places. The W. E. B. DuBois School opened in 1926 for the African-American community in Wake Forest before racial segregation ceased in 1971. After the school outgrew the facility and moved to a new location, the building was vacant for a decade until the DuBois Alumni Association purchased the building and made it into a community center.

Other listings in or near Wake Forest on the National Register of Historic Places are the Bailey-Estes House, Downtown Wake Forest Historic District, Glen Royall Mill Village Historic District, Lea Laboratory, Oakforest, Powell House, Purefoy-Chappell House and Outbuildings, Purefoy-Dunn Plantation, Rock Cliff Farm, Royall Cotton Mill Commissary, South Brick House, Thompson House, Wake Forest Historic District, Wakefield Dairy Complex, and Wakefields.

Wake Forest Historical Museum, also known as the Dr. Calvin Jones House, was built in 1820 and was the residence of the first president of Wake Forest College and the center of activities that took place at the school. The museum displays the history of the town of Wake Forest as well as Wake Forest University. The house contains collections of photos, books, college publications, furniture, documents, professors’ writings, and medical, law and sports memorabilia.

Library
The Wake County Public Library System operates a branch in Wake Forest.

Parks and recreation
Wake Forest is home to the Falls Lake State Recreation Area.

Wake Forest is served by ten parks and community centers. They include the following:
 Plummer Park
 Joyner Park
 Tyler Run Park
 Holding Park and Wake Forest Community House
 J.B. Flaherty Park
 Taylor Street Park and Alston Massenburg Center
 Ailey Young Park
 H.L. Miller Park
 Kiwanis Park
 Smith Creek Soccer Center

Transportation

Passenger
 Interstate Highway: Wake Forest can be accessed by I-85 and I-40. The town is located to the east of I-85 and north of I-40.
 Wake Forest is not served directly by passenger trains. Amtrak serves nearby Raleigh.
 Local bus: The Triangle Transit Authority operates buses that serve the region and connect to municipal bus systems in Raleigh, Durham, and Chapel Hill.

Roads
 Wake Forest is located off US 1 (also known as Capital Boulevard in northern Wake County), a major north–south U.S. Highway that serves the East Coast of the United States.
 Other highways that run through the area include NC 96 and NC 98.

Media

On air
 WCPE-FM, located in Wake Forest, is a classical music station that provides its programming over the air, via the Internet, and via C-band and Ku-band satellite.

Newspaper
 The town's independently owned community newspaper, The Wake Weekly, has an average circulation of more than 8,400 copies per week.

Online only
 Wake Forest News is a humor publication with the motto, "Half our news is fit to print".
 Wake Forest Today is the town's first digital daily news portal. It is an online news source that covers local news and events regarding Wake Forest and the surrounding area.

Notable people

References

External links
 
 

 
1820 establishments in North Carolina
Populated places established in 1820